Çelik, meaning "steel" in Turkish, is a Turkish given name and surname. It may refer to:

Given name
 Çelik Gülersoy (1930–2003), Turkish lawyer and long-time president of Touring and Automobile Club of Turkey

Surname

 Alparslan Çelik (born 1982), Turkish member of the Syrian Turkmen Brigades
 Fatih Çelik, Turkish Para Taekwondo practitioner
 Fırat Çelik (born 1981), Turkish-German actor
 Gülderen Çelik (born 1980), Turkish female karateka
 Hüseyin Çelik (born 1959), Turkish politician
 Metin Çelik (born 1970), Turkish-Dutch politician
 Nurcan Çelik (born 1980), Turkish women's footballer and football club owner
 Ömer Çelik (born 1968), Turkish politician and government minister
 Pelin Çelik (born 1982), Turkish female volleyball player
 Recep Çelik (born 1983), Turkish racewalker
 Sanem Çelik (born 1975), Turkish actress
 Tantek Çelik, Turkish-American computer scientist
 Yasin Çelik (born 1975), Turkish footballer
 Zeki Çelik (born 1997), Turkish footballer

Turkish-language surnames
Turkish masculine given names